Henderson Eels FC is a Solomon Islands football club, which plays in the Telekom S-League. The club is owned by the managing director of Advance Technology Limited Hudson Wakio and his Wife Hellen Wakio. Until 2017 they played in the Honiara Football League, but since the 2017 season they play in the highest level in Solomon Islands. Besides soccer, the club also has a futsal team.

Achievements
Telekom S-League champions 2020-21: 1st

Current squad
Squad for 2020 OFC Champions League

 Staff 

Sports:
 Head coach: 
 Eddie Marahare

 Assistant coach: Michael Oritaimae

 Team Manager: Peter Nanaoa

Owner:

 Hellen Wakio

 Hudson Wakio

 Director of Sport: Gregory Fakaia

Media Officer:

 Romulus Huta

Medical:Physio:''
 George Lui

Futsal team 
The Futsal side plays the SIPA Futsal Challenge and placed last in 2018 in Group B.

References

External links 
 Official site

Football clubs in the Solomon Islands
Honiara
Association football clubs established in 2010
2010 establishments in the Solomon Islands